The 2017–18 Sunfoil 3-Day Cup was a first-class cricket competition that took place in South Africa from 12 October 2017 to 15 April 2018. The competition was played between the thirteen South African provincial teams and Namibia. Unlike its counterpart, the Sunfoil Series, the matches were three days in length instead of four. The tournament was played in parallel with the 2017–18 CSA Provincial One-Day Challenge, a List A competition which features the same teams.

Northerns and Free State were the defending champions, as the final of the previous tournament ended in a draw.

In the fixture between Border and Eastern Province in November 2017, Marco Marais of Border scored 300 not out from 191 deliveries. This was the fastest triple century in first-class cricket, the ninth triple century in first-class cricket in South Africa and the first in the country since 2010.

Following Namibia's fixture against Free State in February 2018, Namibia's captain Sarel Burger and vice-captain Craig Williams retired from cricket. They played their final match for Namibia in the corresponding one-day fixture in the 2017–18 CSA Provincial One-Day Challenge on 25 February 2018.

The final was played between KwaZulu-Natal and Namibia at the Kingsmead Cricket Ground in Durban, starting on 12 April 2018. It was the first time that Namibia had reached the final of the 3-Day Cup. KwaZulu-Natal won the tournament, beating Namibia by an innings and 25 runs.

Points table

Pool A

 Team qualified for the final

Pool B

 Team qualified for the final

Fixtures

October 2017

November 2017

December 2017

January 2018

February 2018

March 2018

Final

References

External links
 Series home at ESPN Cricinfo

South African domestic cricket competitions
Sunfoil 3-Day Cup
2017–18 South African cricket season
Sunfoil Series